The International Emmy Award for Best Non-English Language U.S. Primetime Program is presented by the International Academy of Television Arts & Sciences (IATAS) to the best primetime programs in a language other than English produced and initially aired in the United States.

Rules and Regulation 
Under the rules of the International Academy of Television Arts and Sciences (IATAS), programs produced and broadcast in the United States, and originally created for television, are eligible. Productions must initially be broadcast in the country between January 1 and December 31 of the previous year. Programs with a simulcast within the US may choose to enter this category or compete in the general categories of the International Emmy. Also, not have been submitted in any other Emmy competition (including any U.S. competition); not even released in theaters, inside or outside the US, before the first television broadcast.

Winners and nominees

2010s

2020s

References

External links
 International Emmy Awards

Non-English Language U.S. Primetime Program